Culter is a genus of cyprinid fish, consisting of four species found in freshwater of eastern Asia (Siberia to Vietnam). The name is derived from the Latin word culter, meaning "knife". Culter is closely related to Chanodichthys and some species have been moved between these genera.

Species 
 Culter alburnus Basilewsky, 1855
 Culter flavipinnis Tirant, 1883
 Culter oxycephaloides Kreyenberg & Pappenheim, 1908
 Culter recurviceps (J. Richardson, 1846)

References 

 
Ray-finned fish genera